is a passenger railway station in the city of Tatebayashi, Gunma, Japan, operated by the private railway operator Tōbu Railway. The station is numbered "TI-31".

Lines

Station layout
Watarase Station has one island platform, connected to the station building by an underground passageway.

Platforms

Adjacent stations

History
Watarase Station opened on 16 December 1927.

From 17 March 2012, station numbering was introduced on all Tōbu lines, with Watarase Station becoming "TI-31".

Passenger statistics
In fiscal 2019, the station was used by an average of 266 passengers daily (boarding passengers only).

Surrounding area
 Watarase River

References

External links
 Tobu station information 

Tobu Sano Line
Stations of Tobu Railway
Railway stations in Gunma Prefecture
Railway stations in Japan opened in 1927
Tatebayashi, Gunma